This was the 11th time India participated in the Commonwealth Games. India ranked 6th in the final medal tally.

Medalists

Gold medalists

Silver medalists

Bronze medalists

References

India at the Commonwealth Games
1994 in Indian sport
Nations at the 1994 Commonwealth Games